The  Miss Wisconsin USA competition is the pageant that selects the representative for the state of Wisconsin in the Miss USA pageant.  Since 2007, the state pageant has been directed by Future Productions of Savage, Minnesota.

Wisconsin is one of the least successful states in the Miss USA system with only seven placements in over sixty years as the state has yet to win the Miss USA title. The most recent placement was Bishara Dorre in 2014, placing Top 10. The state's highest placing was Mary Cook earning 2nd runner-up in 1974, and they had no placements from 1979 until 2007, when Caitlin Morrall made the top fifteen. In 2005, Melissa Ann Young won the Miss Congeniality award. Elyzabeth Lee Pham won Miss Photogenic in 1999 and Kate Redeker at Miss USA 2016.

Hollis Brown of Milwaukee was crowned Miss Wisconsin USA 2022 on May 8, 2022, at Madison Marriott West Hotel in Middleton. She represented Wisconsin for the title of Miss USA 2022.

Gallery of titleholders

Results summary

Placements
2nd runner-up: Mary Lynn Cook (1974)
3rd runner-up: Jodi Bonham (1967)
Top 10/12: Kathryn Wituschek (1979), Bishara Dorre (2014)
Top 15/20: Rita Delores Younger (1954), Jeanne Boulay (1955), Caitlin Morrall (2007)

Wisconsin holds a record of 7 placements at Miss USA.

Awards
Miss Photogenic: Elyzabeth Lee Pham (1999), Kate Redeker (2016)
Miss Congeniality: Melissa Ann Young (2005)
Best State Costume: Diane Modrow (1973)

Winners 

Color key

References

External links

Wisconsin
Wisconsin culture
Women in Wisconsin
Recurring events established in 1952
1952 establishments in Wisconsin
Annual events in Wisconsin